John Dove (died 1664/5), regicide of Charles I.

John Dove may also refer to:

 John Dove (director), British theatre director who directed In Extremis
 John Dove (1872–1934), editor of The Round Table in years 1921–1934

See also
Jonathan Dove, British composer